Aydelotte is a community located on State Highway 18 in Pottawatomie County, Oklahoma, United States, north of Shawnee. The town platted by the Santa Fe Railroad in 1903 was called Hansmeyer, but became Aydelotte for one of the railroad employees, J.M. Aydelotte.

Sources
Shirk, George H. Oklahoma Place Names. Norman: University of Oklahoma Press, 1987.  .

Unincorporated communities in Pottawatomie County, Oklahoma
Unincorporated communities in Oklahoma